Johnstown is the largest city in Cambria County, Pennsylvania, United States. The population was 18,411 as of the 2020 census. It is also part of the Johnstown–Somerset combined statistical area, which includes both Cambria and Somerset Counties.

History

Johnstown was settled in 1770. The city has experienced three major floods in its history. At least 2,209 people died as a result of the flood and subsequent fire that raged through the debris. Another major flood occurred in 1936. Despite a pledge by President Franklin Delano Roosevelt to make the city flood free, and subsequent work to do so, another major flood occurred in 1977.

Before becoming an independent town, Windber, Pennsylvania was considered a part of the city.

The city is home to five national historic districts: the Downtown Johnstown Historic District, Cambria City Historic District, Minersville Historic District, Moxham Historic District, and Old Conemaugh Borough Historic District. Individual listings on the National Register of Historic Places are the Grand Army of the Republic Hall, Cambria Iron Company, Cambria Public Library Building, Bridge in Johnstown City, Nathan's Department Store, and Johnstown Inclined Railway.

18th century
A settlement was established here in 1791 by Joseph Jahns, in whose honor it was named, and the place was soon laid out as a town.

19th century
Johnstown was formally platted as Conemaugh Old Town in 1800 by the Swiss German immigrant Joseph Johns (born Josef Schantz). The settlement was initially known as "Schantzstadt", but was soon anglicized to Johnstown. The community incorporated as Conemaugh borough January 12, 1831, but renamed Johnstown on April 14, 1834. From 1834 to 1854, the city was a port and key transfer point along the Pennsylvania Main Line Canal. Johnstown was at the head of the canal's western branch, with canal boats having been transported over the mountains via the Allegheny Portage Railroad and refloated here, to continue the trip by water to Pittsburgh and the Ohio Valley. Perhaps the most famous passenger who traveled via the canal to visit Johnstown briefly was Charles Dickens in 1842. By 1854, canal transport became redundant with the completion of the Pennsylvania Railroad, which now spanned the state. With the coming of the railroads, the city's growth improved. Johnstown became a stop on the main line of the Pennsylvania Railroad and was connected with the Baltimore & Ohio. The railroads provided large-scale development of the region's mineral wealth.

Iron, coal, and steel quickly became central to the town of Johnstown. By 1860, the Cambria Iron Company of Johnstown was the leading steel producer in the United States, outproducing steel giants in Pittsburgh and Cleveland. Through the second half of the 19th century, Johnstown made much of the nation's barbed wire. Johnstown prospered from skyrocketing demand in the western United States for barbed wire. It owned  of valuable mineral lands in a region with a ready supply of iron, coal and limestone.

Floods were almost a yearly event in the valley during the 1880s. On the afternoon of May 30, 1889, following a quiet Memorial Day ceremony and a parade, it began raining in the valley. The next day water filled the streets, and rumors began that a dam holding an artificial lake in the mountains to the northeast might give way. The destruction in Johnstown occurred in only about 10 minutes. What had been a thriving steel town with homes, churches, saloons, a library, a railroad station, electric street lights, a roller rink, and two opera houses was buried under mud and debris. Out of a population of approximately 30,000 at the time, at least 2,209 people are known to have perished in the disaster. An infamous site of a major fire during the flood was the old stone Pennsylvania Railroad bridge located where the Stonycreek and Little Conemaugh rivers join to form the Conemaugh River. The bridge still stands today.

The Johnstown flood of 1889 established the American Red Cross as the pre-eminent emergency relief organization in the United States. Founder Clara Barton, then 67, came to Johnstown with 50 doctors and nurses and set up tent hospitals as well as temporary "hotels" for the homeless, and stayed on for five months to coordinate relief efforts.

The mills were back in operation within a month. The Cambria Works grew, and Johnstown became more prosperous than ever. The disaster had not destroyed the community but strengthened it. Later generations would draw on lessons learned in 1889. After the successful merger of six surrounding boroughs, Johnstown became a city on April 7, 1890.

20th century

In 1923, Johnstown Mayor Joseph Cauffiel ordered the expulsion of all African-Americans and Mexicans in Johnstown who had lived in Johnstown for less than seven years. The edict was in response to a fatal altercation between Robert Young, a black man, and Johnstown police officers. African-Americans had settled in the Rosedale neighborhood during the Great Migration. Although Cauffiel's edict of expulsion was without legal force, Cauffiel's declaration resulted in around 500 African-Americans fleeing the city. The Ku Klux Klan burned twelve crosses outside Johnstown in an attempt to intimidate Rosedale's black population. Governor Gifford Pinchot intervened to prevent Cauffiel from enforcing the edict.

In the early 20th century, the population reached 67,000 people. The city's first commercial radio station, WJAC, began broadcasts in 1925. The downtown boasted at least five major department stores, including Glosser Brothers, which in the 1950s gave birth to the Gee Bee chain of department stores. However, the St Patrick's Day flood of 1936 combined with the gnawing effects of the Great Depression left Johnstown struggling again, but only temporarily. Johnstown's citizens mobilized to achieve a permanent solution to the flooding problem and wrote to President Franklin Roosevelt pleading for federal aid. Starting in August 1938, continuing for the next five years, the U. S. Army Corps of Engineers gouged, widened, deepened, and realigned  of river channel in the city, and encased the river banks in concrete and reinforced steel. In a campaign organized by the Chamber of Commerce, thousands of Johnstown's citizens wrote to friends and relatives across the country hoping to bring new business to the town.

Professional ice hockey found a home in Johnstown, starting in 1941 with the Johnstown Blue Birds for one season and returning in 1950 with the Johnstown Jets. The Jets later hosted an exhibition game against Maurice Richard and the Montreal Canadiens on November 20, 1951. Newcomers to the town heard little about the tragic past. Johnstown proclaimed itself "flood-free", a feeling reinforced when Johnstown was virtually the only riverside city in Pennsylvania not to flood during Hurricane Agnes in 1972.

The immediate post-World War II years mark Johnstown's peak as a steel maker and fabricator. At its peak, steel provided Johnstowners with more than 13,000 full-time, well-paying jobs. However, increased domestic and foreign competition, coupled with Johnstown's relative distance from its primary iron ore source in the western Great Lakes, led to a steady decline in profitability. New capital investment waned. Johnstown's mountainous terrain, and the resulting poor layout for the mills' physical plant strung along  of river bottom lands, compounded the problem.

New regulations ordered by the EPA in the 1970s also hit Johnstown, with the aging Cambria plant (now Bethlehem Steel) especially hard. However, with encouragement from the steel company, the city fathers organized an association called Johnstown Area Regional Industries (JARI) and, within a year, raised $3 million for industrial development in the area. Bethlehem Steel, which was the major contributor to the fund, committed itself to bringing new steelmaking technologies to Johnstown because they were impressed by the city's own efforts to diversify.

Extensive damage from the 1977 flood was heavy and there was talk of the company pulling out. Again, the city won a reprieve from the company's top management, which had always regarded the Johnstown works with special affection because of its history and reputation. As the increasing amount of federal environmental regulations became more difficult to comply with and the issues with the aging manufacturing facilities grew more significant, and as steel companies began closing down plants all over the country, by 1982 it looked as if Johnstown had exhausted its appeals. By the early 1990s, Johnstown abandoned most of its steel production, although some limited fabrication work continues.

21st century

In 2003, U.S. Census data showed that Johnstown was the least likely city in the United States to attract newcomers; however, what were previously relatively weak opportunities provided by the local manufacturing and service economies have more recently begun to burgeon, attracting outsiders. Gamesa Corporación Tecnológica, a Spanish wind energy company, opened its first U.S. wind turbine blade manufacturing facility near here in 2006 which subsequently closed in 2014. Several wind turbines are sited on Babcock Ridge, the "Eastern Continental Divide", along the eastern edge of Cambria and Somerset counties. Lockheed Martin relocated a facility from Greenville, South Carolina, to Johnstown in 2008. Höganäs AB, a Swedish powdered metals manufacturer operates two plants in the region, one in the Moxham section of the city and also in nearby Hollsopple in Somerset County. Companies like Concurrent Technologies Corporation, DRS Laurel Technologies, ITSI Biosciences, Kongsberg Defense and more throughout the region are in business for themselves. Recent construction in the surrounding region, the downtown, and adjacent Kernville neighborhood—including a new  Regional Technology Complex that will house a division of Northrop Grumman, among other tenants—signal the increasing dependence of Johnstown's economy on the U.S. government's defense budget. The high-tech defense industry is now the main non-health-care staple of the Johnstown economy, with the region pulling in well over $100M annually in federal government contracts, punctuated by one of the premier defense trade shows in the U.S., the annual Showcase for Commerce.

Johnstown remains a regional medical, educational, cultural, and communications center. As in many other locales, health care provides a significant percentage of the employment opportunities in the city. The region is located right in the middle of the "Health Belt", an area stretching from the Midwest to New England and down the East Coast that has had massive growth in the health care industry. Major health care centers include Memorial Medical Center and Windber Medical Center, the Laurel Highlands Neuro-Rehabilitation Center, and the John P. Murtha Neuroscience and Pain Institute, with its advances in treating wounded veterans, and the Joyce Murtha Breast Care Center's focus on early diagnosis and advanced treatment.

Cambria-Rowe Business College, located in the Moxham section of Johnstown, offers concentrated career training and has continuously served Johnstown since 1891. The Pasquerilla Performing Arts Center, a concert/theatrical venue at the University of Pittsburgh at Johnstown, attracts high-quality performers. The Johnstown Symphony Orchestra and the recently formed Johnstown Symphony Chamber Players provide classical music. The Johnstown Concert Ballet, centered in the Historic Cambria City District, provides classical ballet performances and training to the area. The Pasquerilla Convention Center was recently constructed downtown, adjacent to the historic Cambria County War Memorial Arena at 326 Napoleon Street. Point Stadium, a baseball park where Babe Ruth once played, was razed and rebuilt. A zoning ordinance created an artist zone and a traditional neighborhood zone to encourage both artistic endeavors and the old-fashioned "Mom and Pop" enterprises that had difficulty thriving under the previous code. The Bottleworks Ethnic Arts Center offers many exhibitions, events, performances, and classes that celebrate the rich and diverse cultural heritage of the area.

The Johnstown Chiefs ice hockey team played for 22 seasons, the longest period a franchise of the league stayed in one city. The Chiefs were a member team of the ECHL, and played their home games in the Cambria County War Memorial Arena. The Chiefs' decision to relocate caused a flood of public interest in the sport of hockey. As many as four leagues were interested in having a team in the War Memorial. In the end the city landed a deal with another ECHL team, the Wheeling Nailers, who played parts of two seasons at the War Memorial. A full-time tenant arrived in 2012, when the Johnstown Tomahawks of the junior North American Hockey League began play.

The recently established ART WORKS in Johnstown! houses artist studios in some of the area's architecturally significant but underused industrial buildings. The ART WORKS in Johnstown project is projected to be a non-profit LEED-certified green building. The Frank & Sylvia Pasquerilla Heritage Discovery Center opened in 2001 with the permanent exhibit "America: Through Immigrant Eyes", which tells the story of immigration to the area during the Industrial Revolution. In June 2009, the Heritage Discovery Center opened the Johnstown Children's Museum and premiered "The Mystery of Steel", a film detailing the history of steel in Johnstown. The Bottleworks Ethnic Arts Center, ART WORKS, and the Heritage Discovery Center are located in the historic Cambria City section of town, which boasts a variety of eastern European ethnic churches and social halls. This neighborhood hosted the National Folk Festival for three years in the early 1990s, which expanded into the Flood City Music Festival. Johnstown also hosts the annual Thunder in the Valley motorcycle rally during the fourth week of June; the event has attracted motorcyclists from across the Northeast to the city of Johnstown since 1998. Well over 200,000 participants enjoyed the 2008 edition of Thunder in the Valley, and the event continues to grow in size.

Significant efforts have been made to deal with deteriorating housing, brownfields, drug problems, and other issues as population leaves the city limits and concentrates in suburban boroughs and townships. The Johnstown Fire Department has become a leader in developing intercommunication systems among first responders, and is now a national model for ways to avoid the communications problems which faced many first responders during the September 11, 2001 attacks.

Geography
Johnstown is located in southwestern Cambria County at  (40.325174, −78.920954). The Conemaugh River forms at Johnstown at the confluence of its tributaries, the Stonycreek River and the Little Conemaugh.

Neighborhoods 
Johnstown is divided into many neighborhoods, each with its own unique, ethnic feel. These include the Downtown Business District, Kernville, Hornerstown, Roxbury, Old Conemaugh Borough, Prospect, Woodvale, Minersville, Cambria City, Morrellville (West End), Oakhurst, Coopersdale, Walnut Grove, Moxham and the 8th Ward. Before 1900, the town of Windber, Pennsylvania, was a suburb of Johnstown, until its incorporation.

Suburbs 
West Hills: Westmont, Southmont, Brownstown, Ferndale, Upper Yoder Township, and Lower Yoder Township
East Hills: Richland Township, Geistown, Windber, Lorain and Stonycreek Township.

The borough of Dale is an enclave located within the city of Johnstown, situated on the southeast side of the city between Hornerstown and Walnut Grove.

North: East Conemaugh, Franklin, Daisytown, as well as West Taylor, Middle Taylor, and East Taylor townships.
Other areas surrounding the city include Ferndale, Seward, Jackson Township, South Fork, Salix, Beaverdale, Sidman, St. Michael, Dunlo, Wilmore, Elton and Summerhill.

Climate

Demographics

As of the 2010 census, there were 20,978 people, 9,917 households, and 5,086 families residing in the city. The population density was 3,555.6 people per square mile (1,371.1/km). There were 11,978 housing units at an average density of 2,030.2 per square mile (782.9/km). The racial makeup of the city was 80.0% White, 14.6% African American, 0.2% Native American, 0.2% Asian, 0.02% Pacific Islander, 0.7% some other race, and 4.3% from two or more races. Hispanics or Latinos of any race were 3.1% of the population. In the three-year period ending in 2010, it was estimated that 22.3% of the population were of German, 15.8% Irish, 12.9% Italian, 7.7% Slovak, 6.7% English, 5.6% Polish, and 6.1% American ancestry.

At the 2010 census, there were 9,917 households, of which 22.0% had children under the age of 18 living with them, 28.5% were headed by married couples living together, 17.1% had a female householder with no husband present, and 48.7% were non-families. Of all households, 43.0% were made up of individuals, and 17.9% were someone living alone who was 65 years of age or older. The average household size was 2.08 and the average family size was 2.87.

The age distribution was 21.7% under 18, 8.4% from 18 to 24, 24.4% from 25 to 44, 27.9% from 45 to 64, and 18.5% who were 65 or older. The median age was 41.8 years. For every 100 females, there were 87.9 males. For every 100 females age 18 and over, there were 84.5 males.

For the period 2011–2013, the estimated median annual income for a household in the city was $23,785, and the median income for a family was $32,221. Male full-time workers had a median income of $31,026 versus $28,858 for females. The per capita income for the city was $15,511. 34.2% of the population and 26.9% of families were below the poverty line. Of the total population, 55.0% of those under the age of 18 and 18.4% of those 65 and older were living below the poverty line.

The unemployment average is reported at 9%. Most of the jobs center around health care, defense, telemarketing and retail.

Economy
A reduction in steel production also reduced coal mining in Pennsylvania, which was important to the Johnstown economy. In 1982, Johnstown's longest-serving mayor, Herbert Pfuhl Jr., said that, as a result of the decline, city revenues had fallen approximately 35 percent.

The Johnstown economy later recovered somewhat, largely due to industry around health care and high-tech defense, but was reported to be the third-fastest shrinking city in the U.S. in 2017. Nonetheless, in 2018, Johnstown was ranked 169th among "The Best Small Places For Business And Careers" in the U.S., by Forbes.

Major employers in the area include:

 American Red Cross
 AmeriServ Financial
 Arthur J. Gallagher & Co.
 Atlantic Broadband
 Berkshire Hathaway—Penn Machine
 Concurrent Technologies Corporation
 Conemaugh Health System
 Concentrix
 Crown American
 DRS Technologies
 Galliker's
 Höganäs AB
 Kongsberg Gruppen
 Lockheed Martin
 Martin-Baker
 Metropolitan Life
 Northrop Grumman
 Pepsi Bottling Group
 Zamias Services, Inc.

Arts and culture

Landmarks

 Cambria County War Memorial Arena
 Cambria Iron Company is a National Historic Landmark located near the downtown area. Johnstown's city seal has an image of this facility.
 Famous Coney Island Hot Dogs – Founded in 1916, this eatery is synonymous with Johnstown culture.
 Frank J. Pasquerilla Conference Center
 Frank & Sylvia Pasquerilla Heritage Discovery Center – includes several attractions: "America: Through Immigrant Eyes," a permanent exhibit about immigration to the area around the turn of the 20th century; the Johnstown Children's Museum, a  children's museum; and the Iron & Steel Gallery, a three-story gallery that includes "The Mystery of Steel," a film about the history of steel in Johnstown.
Grandview also holds the remains of the 777 victims of the 1889 Johnstown Flood who were not able to be identified.
 Johnstown Flood National Memorial – the National Park Service site that preserves the remains of the South Fork Dam and portions of the Lake Conemaugh bed.
 The Johnstown Flood Museum – shows the Academy Award-winning film The Johnstown Flood as part of the museum experience.
 Johnstown Inclined Plane is the world's steepest vehicular inclined plane.
 Pasquerilla Plaza (the Crown American Building)
 Peoples Natural Gas Park
 Point Stadium
 Silver Drive-In – first opened in 1962. While other such facilities in the area have closed over the course of years, the Silver survived through public outcry over proposals to close and demolish it, making a comeback in 2005. Located in Richland Township, it is now the only drive-in theater in the Johnstown region.
 Staple Bend Tunnel is the first railroad tunnel constructed in the United States, and a National Historic Landmark.
 The Stone Bridge is a historic railroad bridge over the Conemaugh River.

Events
Johnstown hosts a number of events each year. "Thunder in the Valley" is a motorcycle rally with weekend crowds ranging from 150,000 to 200,000. The AAABA amateur baseball tournament is held at the Point Stadium in downtown Johnstown. The Flood City Music Festival is held at Peoples Natural Gas Park. The Sunnehanna Amateur golf tournament is held once a year at Sunnehanna Country Club. Professional golfers have played in this tournament as amateurs such as Tiger Woods, and Arnold Palmer.

Sports

Johnstown has been home to a long succession of minor league hockey franchises dating back to 1940. One of the more recent manifestations, the Johnstown Chiefs, were named for their Slap Shot counterparts. The team made their debut in January 1988 with the All-American Hockey League, joining the league midway through the season. After one season in the AAHL, the Chiefs became one of five teams to join the newly founded East Coast Hockey League (now ECHL). The team announced in February 2010 that they would be leaving Johnstown for a location in South Carolina. In April 2010 it was announced that the Wheeling Nailers of the ECHL would call Johnstown home for 10 games during the regular season and for one of their preseason games. They returned once again for the 2011–12 season. After the 2011-2012 NAHL hockey season, the Alaska Avalanche relocated to Johnstown and became the Johnstown Tomahawks and have remained in Johnstown ever since.

The city has history in amateur and professional baseball. Since 1944, Johnstown has been the host city for the AAABA Baseball Tournament held each summer. Several Major League Baseball players have played on AAABA teams over the years, including Hall-of Famers Al Kaline and Reggie Jackson and former Major League managers Joe Torre and Bruce Bochy. The organization also has its own Hall of Fame instituted in its 50th anniversary year of 1994.

In addition, the city has hosted several incarnations of a minor-league baseball team, the Johnstown Johnnies, beginning in 1884. The last team to play as the Johnnies, as a part of the Frontier League, left the city in 2002.

Johnstown also hosts the annual Sunnehanna Amateur golf tournament at its Sunnehanna Country Club. The invitational tournament hosts top amateur golfers from around the United States.

Johnstown is home to the Flood City Water Polo team. Established in 2005 by Zachary Puhala, the team takes its name from the history of floods in the area. FCWP is part of the American Water Polo Organization.

2015 Kraft Hockeyville USA contest

On May 2, 2015, Johnstown was announced as the winner of the 2015 Kraft Hockeyville USA contest and was awarded $150,000 toward improvements of the Cambria County War Memorial Arena. The contest was sponsored through a partnership between Kraft Foods, the National Hockey League (NHL), and National Hockey League Players' Association (NHLPA). In addition to the cash prize, the arena won the opportunity to host the September 29, 2015, NHL pre-season game between the Pittsburgh Penguins and Tampa Bay Lightning.

Crime
Per WJAC; in the year 2022, Johnstown has had 12 homicides as of August. Statistics have not been updated since 2018 — The chances of becoming a victim of a violent crime in Johnstown are 1 in 184 where the average for Pennsylvania is 1 in 316.”

Government
The Johnstown City Hall is located at 401 Main Street. The mayor of Johnstown is Frank Janakovic, and the Deputy Mayor is Marie Mock.

Education

Colleges:
 University of Pittsburgh at Johnstown, located just outside the city limits in Richland Township
 Pennsylvania Highlands Community College
 Christ the Saviour Seminary

Secondary education:
 The Greater Johnstown School District serves residents of Johnstown, West Taylor Township, Lower Yoder Township, and Stonycreek Township.
 The district currently operates a pre-school, an elementary school, a middle school, a high school, and a cyber school.
Bishop McCort High School is a private, Catholic high school serving students in grades 7 through 12.

Technology schools:
 The Greater Johnstown Career and Technology School, located just outside of the city limits in Richland Township

Libraries:
 The Cambria County Library is located at 248 Main Street.

Media
Johnstown's television market is part of the Johnstown/Altoona/State College market. NBC affiliate WJAC-TV 6 (which also operates the market's CW affiliate through The CW Plus on its DT4 subchannel) and Fox affiliate WWCP-TV 8 are licensed in the city. Johnstown is also served by CBS affiliate WTAJ-TV 10 and ABC affiliate WATM-TV 23, both based in Altoona, and State College-based PBS member station WPSU-TV 3, licensed to Clearfield but based on the Pennsylvania State University campus. Several other low-power stations, including WHVL-LD 29 (MyNetworkTV) in State College, also transmit to Johnstown. WPCW 19, the CW's owned-and-operated station in Pittsburgh licensed to Jeannette, began operations in Johnstown and later moved to serve the Pittsburgh area, but would continue to be available in Johnstown until September 2019 as the market's default CW affiliate.

The city is home to three print publications, The Tribune-Democrat, Johnstown Magazine, and Our Town Johnstown.

The Johnstown broadcast market radio stations in the area include WNTJ, WKGE, WJHT, and others.

Infrastructure

Transportation
The main highway connecting Johnstown to the Pennsylvania Turnpike is U.S. Route 219. There is also PA Route 56, which is an expressway from 219 until Walnut Street. From there, it provides a connection to U.S. Route 22 to the north of Johnstown, which connects to Pittsburgh and Altoona.

The local airport is the John Murtha Johnstown-Cambria County Airport, served by United Express, with flights to Washington-Dulles and Chicago-O'Hare.

Passenger rail service is provided by Amtrak's daily Pennsylvanian. The city is located on the former mainline of the Pennsylvania Railroad. Norfolk Southern operates 60–80 trains daily on these rails. CSX also has a branch into the city.

CamTran operates the local bus service and the Johnstown Inclined Plane (funicular). Until 1976, local transit service was operated by a private company, Johnstown Traction Company. Streetcars (or "trolleys") operated in Johnstown until 1960, and trolley buses from 1951 until 1967.

Emergency services
The Johnstown Fire Department has available response teams for Hazardous Materials (HAZMAT) and a boat in which they are able to perform water and ice rescues. Along with the fire department is part of the Special Emergency Response Team (SERT). The fire department also provides on-site classes on fire safety.

The Johnstown Police Department (JPD) has 35 full-time officers and the chief of police is Richard Pritchard.

Notable people

 Alex Azar, United States Secretary of Health and Human Services
 Carroll Baker, Oscar-nominated actress whose Hollywood movie career spanned five decades
 Donald Barlett, journalist and two-time winner of the Pulitzer Prize
 Frank Benford (1887–1948), physicist
 Robert Bernat (1931–1994), brass band conductor
 Mel Bosser (1914–1986), professional baseball player
 Edward R. Bradley (1859–1946), racehorse breeder, owner of four Kentucky Derby winners
 Tom Bradley, football coach, defensive coordinator for UCLA, Penn State
 Charles Wakefield Cadman (1881–1946), composer
 Charles E. Capehart (1833–1911), Medal of Honor winner
 Henry Capehart (1825–1895), Civil War general and Medal of Honor winner
 Robert E. Casey (1909–1982), Pennsylvania State Treasurer from 1977 to 1981
 D. C. Cooper, heavy metal singer
 Joey Covington (1945–2013), drummer (Jefferson Airplane, Jefferson Starship, Hot Tuna)
 Roger Craig, Jeopardy! contestant
 Harry Griffith Cramer Jr. (1926–1957), Special Forces captain, first US Army soldier killed in Vietnam
 Pat Cummings (1956–2012), professional basketball player, '79 through the late '80s
 Steve Ditko (1927–2018), comic book artist and co-creator of Spider-Man
 Pete Duranko (1943–2011), Notre Dame and Denver Broncos football player
 Jim Gallagher, Jr., PGA Tour golfer
 Craig Grebeck, professional baseball player
 Jay Greenberg, journalist
 Count Grog, professional wrestling manager/promoter
 Jack Ham, Pro Football Hall of Fame linebacker
 Carlton Haselrig (1966–2020), Pro Bowl offensive guard with Pittsburgh Steelers, only six-time NCAA Wrestling Champion, Distinguished Member of National Wrestling Hall of Fame
 Artrell Hawkins, professional football player, starting strong safety for the NFL's New England Patriots, Carolina Panthers, and Cincinnati Bengals
 Andrew Hawkins, professional football player, wide receiver for the NFL's Cleveland Browns and star of Spike TV's 4th and Long
 Galen Head (1947–2020), professional ice hockey player and Johnstown hockey contributor
 Victor Heiser (1873–1972), Great Flood of 1889 survivor, physician, and author
 Tamar Simon Hoffs, film director, writer, and producer
 Matthew C. Horner (1901–1972), Mariner Corps Major general
 Incantation, death metal band formed in New York City relocated to Johnstown in the mid-1990s
 E. Snapper Ingram (1884–1966), Los Angeles City Council member, 1927–1933
 Robert T. Jeschonek, award-winning author
 Tim Kazurinsky, comedian and actor, of television's Saturday Night Live and the Police Academy movies
 Natalia Livingston, General Hospital actress
 Olivia Locher, photographer
 Terry McGovern (1880–1918), Hall of Fame boxer
 Susan Meier, romance novelist
 Charles T. Menoher (1862–1930), World War I general
 John Murtha (1932–2010), U.S. congressman
 George Musulin (1914–1987), American army officer of the Office of Strategic Services (OSS) and CIA operative.
 David Noon, composer
 Michael Novak (1933–2017), author, philosopher, Catholic theologian, US diplomat, a George Frederick Jewett Scholar at the American Enterprise Institute; 1994 recipient of Templeton Prize
 Joe O'Donnell (1922–2007), documentarian, photojournalist and a photographer for the US Information Agency
 Joe Pass (1929–1994), jazz guitarist
 Steve Petro (1914–1994), professional football player
 Herb Pfuhl (1928–2011), longest-serving mayor of Johnstown
 Walter Prozialeck, scientist
 Jeff Richardson, professional football player
 Ray Scott (1920–1998), sportscaster, inductee in National Sportscasters and Sportswriters Association Hall of Fame
 Russell Shorto, author of Island at the Center of the World, Descartes' Bones: A Skeletal History of the Conflict Between Faith and Reason, and Smalltime: A Story of My Family and the Mob.
 Edward A. Silk (1916–1955), Medal of Honor winner
 Geroy Simon, professional football player, slotback for the CFL's Saskatchewan Roughriders; recipient of the CFL's Most Outstanding Player Award (2006); CFL's all-time leading wide receiver in receiving yards
 Mark Singel, former Lieutenant Governor of Pennsylvania; acting governor from June 14, 1993, to December 13, 1993
 Emil Sitka (1914–1998), actor, whose famous line "Hold hands, you lovebirds!" earned him the moniker as the fourth of the Three Stooges
 Frank Solich, head football coach at Ohio University; 1998–2003 head coach of Nebraska
 LaRod Stephens-Howling, professional football player, running back for the NFL's Pittsburgh Steelers
 John Stofa, quarterback for NFL's Buffalo Bills, Miami Dolphins, and Cincinnati Bengals
 Michael Strank (1919–1945), World War II hero and one of the six U.S. Marines pictured in the famous Iwo Jima flag raising photo, from Johnstown suburb of Franklin
 BIG Brian Subich, world-ranked competitive eater, competed in the Nathan's Hot Dog eating contest
 John J. Tominac (1922–1998), Medal of Honor recipient
 Richard Verma, US Assistant Secretary of State for Legislative Affairs and US Ambassador to India (2014 nominee)
 Pete Vuckovich, Cy Young Award–winning pitcher
 John Walker, organist
 Benjamin Wallace (1847–1921), American circus owner
 Michael Walzer, philosopher and political scientist, born in New York but raised in Johnstown
 Ian Williams, guitarist and instrumentalist from rock bands Don Caballero (1992–2000) and Battles
 Nan Wynn (1915–1971), singer and actress

In popular culture

The Bruce Springsteen song "The River" mentions the Johnstown Company: "I got a job working construction, for the Johnstown Company, but lately there ain't been much work, on account of the economy." "Highway Patrolman", another Springsteen song, has the lyrics "as the band played 'Night of the Johnstown Flood'."

The 1977 film Slap Shot, directed by George Roy Hill and starring Paul Newman, was a parody loosely based on the real-life Johnstown Jets ice hockey team and its North American Hockey League championship in 1976. In the movie, Johnstown was rechristened "Charlestown" and the Jets as the Charlestown Chiefs. The film's premiere engendered some local controversy, as some thought Johnstown was portrayed in a less than flattering light. Slap Shot has since become the iconic movie about hockey and its foibles. Screenwriter Nancy Dowd would revive the fake town of "Charlestown" in her screenplay for the 1981 punk rock satire Ladies and Gentlemen, The Fabulous Stains, but the film itself was shot in Canada.

All the Right Moves, a high school football drama set in the fictional town of Ampipe and featuring Tom Cruise, Lea Thompson, and Craig T. Nelson, was filmed in the area. Locations seen in the movie include the old Johnstown High School in the Kernville neighborhood, the Carpatho-Russian Citizen's Club in East Conemaugh, the Franklin works of Bethlehem Steel, Point Stadium, the Johnstown Cochran Junior High football practice field, and the Johnstown Vo-Tech football locker room.

The Johnstown Flood, written and directed by Charles Guggenheim, won the Academy Award for Best Documentary, Short Subject in 1989. The film was commissioned by the Johnstown Flood Museum Association, which later reorganized as the Johnstown Area Heritage Association, and is shown every hour at the Johnstown Flood Museum.

Mystery novel writer K. C. Constantine fictionalized many elements of Johnstown and its culture as "Rocksburg" in his novels, although the nearby city of Greensburg also provides some of the lore for Rocksburg.

In 2000, Kathleen Cambor published In Sunlight, In A Beautiful Garden. The novel followed its characters through the events leading up to and including the 1889 flood. Although the protagonists in the novel were fictional, several historical figures, such as Andrew Mellon, Henry Clay Frick and Daniel Morrell were also depicted in the book.

Author James Patterson had his fictional serial kidnapper, Gary Soneji, from Along Came a Spider stop at a convenience store on his way through Johnstown. Author David Morrell had his fictional character "Eliot" recruit two brothers from an orphanage in Johnstown to train as assassins in The Brotherhood of the Rose.

In the 1978 film Dawn of the Dead, a character mentions that they are flying over Johnstown, Pennsylvania, and quips that the people are actually entertained by the zombie outbreak. George A. Romero filmed the majority of the zombie movie at the Monroeville Mall, some 50-odd miles away.

Johnstown is featured in Defenders of Freedom Volume 1 (2010) and Defenders of Freedom Volume 2 (2012). Both are hardcover books, published by the Williamsport Sun-Gazette, featuring first person stories of Lycoming County, Pennsylvania, military veterans who served in World War II, Korea and Vietnam. In the foreword of each volume, Johnstown native and nationally recognized newspaper publisher Bernard A. Oravec shares stories of his father's military police service in Germany and growing up in Johnstown's west end during the 1970s.

Author and Johnstown native Robert T. Jeschonek wrote a nonfiction history of the local landmark Glosser Bros. Department Store and its multimillion-dollar parent company in his 2014 book Long Live Glosser's. Jeschonek also depicted a fictional 1975 tour of the Glosser Brothers Department Store in his 2013 novelette Christmas at Glosser's. Johnstown is the setting of Jeschonek's story Fear of Rain, which was nominated for a British Fantasy Award. His mystery novels Death by Polka and The Masked Family are also set in and around Johnstown.

Johnstown is featured in A Community Keystone; The Official History of The Williamsport Sun-Gazette (2018). This 448-page hardcover book contains a detailed newspaper and community history that chronicles the entire 217 years of newspaper publication in Williamsport, Pennsylvania, since 1801. This book was featured on PCN's PA Books television show on November 11, 2018. The PA Books episode contains a lengthy discussion with Johnstown native and nationally recognized newspaper publisher Bernard A. Oravec, who wrote the foreword and published the book. In his foreword, Mr. Oravec describes the importance of defending the First Amendment and his family's experience as eastern European immigrants in Johnstown during the early-mid 20th century.

The 2021 book Smalltime: The Story of My Family and the Mob, by Russell Shorto, is the story of organized crime in and around Johnstown, and the connections Shorto's family had to the American Mafia. Another book that was published in 2021, Disastrous Floods and the Demise of Steel in Johnstown, by Pat Farabaugh, explores the three major floods that hit the city in 1889, 1936 and 1977, as well as the history of the steel and coal industry in the region.

See also
 Cambria Somerset Authority, water supply authority for Cambria County and Somerset County
 Ehrenfeld, Pennsylvania, Nanty Glo, Pennsylvania, and Windber, Pennsylvania, nearby communities with notable "Johnstowners"

References

Further reading
 
  A novel about the flood.
 
 
 
 
 
  Biography and history of the Mafia in Johnstown.

External links

 
 Johnstown, Pennsylvania - Johnstown, PA - 1st Hockeyville USA

 
1770 establishments in Pennsylvania
Cities in Cambria County, Pennsylvania
Cities in Pennsylvania
Populated places established in 1770